Stella or STELLA may refer to:

Art, entertainment, and media

Films
Stella (1921 film), directed by Edwin J. Collins
Stella (1943 film), with Zully Moreno
Stella (1950 film), with Ann Sheridan and Victor Mature
Stella (1955 film), directed by Michael Cacoyannis, starring Melina Mercouri
Stella (1976 film), written and directed by Luigi Cozzi
Stella (1983 film), directed by Laurent Heynemann, see Jean-Louis Bauer
Stella (1990 film), starring Bette Midler
Stella (2008 film), directed by Sylvie Verheyde

Literature
Stella, a novel attributed to Haitian author Emeric Bergeaud
, by Jan de Hartog, made into the 1958 film The Key
Stella (Norwegian magazine), a Norwegian lifestyle magazine
Stella (Swedish magazine), a Swedish science fiction magazine
Stella, a magazine supplement for The Sunday Telegraph 
Stella Prize, an Australian literary prize

Music
Stella (band), a Finnish rock-pop band

The Stellas, a Canadian country music duo
Stella (album), a 1985 album by Swiss band Yello
Stella, a 2006 album by Italian band Uzeda
"Stella" (song), by All Time Low

Television
Stella (Croatian TV series), a 2013 TV series starring Amar Bukvić
Stella (UK TV series), a comedy drama set in South Wales
Stella (U.S. TV series), a comedy program by the Stella troupe

Other
Stella (comedy group), a comedy troupe consisting of Michael Showalter, Michael Ian Black and David Wain
Stella (given name), including a list of characters with the name
 Stella, a 2021 card game derived from Dixit

Companies and product names
Stella (beer), an Egyptian beer
Stella (bicycle company), a French bicycle manufacturer
Stella cherry, a sweet cherry cultivar
Stella (guitar), a brand of a guitar
STELLA (language courses), online language courses
Stella (scooter), a vintage scooter brand
Stella (solar vehicles), three iterations of a practical solar powered racecar
Stella Artois, a Belgian beer
Stella Cheese, a division of Saputo Incorporated
Stella D'oro, an American brand of cookies
Subaru Stella, an automobile

Computing and technology
Stella (emulator), multiplatform Atari 2600 game-console emulator.
STELLA (programming language), a simulation modeling tool developed by Barry Richmond
Stella (software), polyhedra modeling software
Stella, a code name for the Atari 2600 game console,
Stella, the IBM Blue Gene-L, supercomputer used with the LOFAR radio telescope project

Geographic features
Corno Stella, a mountain of Lombardy, Italy
Lake Stella, a lake in Alger County, Michigan, U.S.
Monte Stella (disambiguation), several Italian mountains that share the name Monte Stella
Pizzo Stella, a mountain of Lombardy, Italy
Stella Creek, in the Argentine Islands, Wilheim Archipela
Stella Point, on Mount Kilimanjaro, Tanzania

People
Stella (surname), including a list of people bearing the name
Stella (given name), including a list of people bearing the name
Stella (singer) (born 1980), Singaporean singer
Stella (Namibian singer), Stella Tjazuko !Naruses, Namibian singer

Places

England
Stella Park, a village in Tyne and Wear
Stella power stations, a demolished pair of coal-fired power stations in Tyne and Wear

Italy
Stella, Liguria, a town in Liguria
Stella Cilento, a town in Campania
Stella (Naples), a neighbourhood
Monte Stella (disambiguation), several locations that share the name

United States
Stella, Kentucky, an unincorporated community in Calloway County
Stella, Missouri, a village in Newton County
Stella, Nebraska, a village in Richardson County
Stella, North Carolina, an unincorporated community in Carteret County
Stella, Ohio, an unincorporated community in Vinton County
Stella, Fayette County, Texas, a ghost town
Stella, Harris County, Texas, a former unincorporated area incorporated into Houston, Texas
Stella, Washington, an unincorporated community in Cowlitz County
Stella, Wisconsin, a town in Oneida County

Elsewhere
Stella, North West, a town in North West Province, South Africa
Stella, Ontario, a village on Amherst Island, Ontario, Canada

Stella-Plage, a seaside resort in northern France
Stella, Puerto Rico, a commune in Rincón
Stella Land, a Boer republic in South Africa's North West Province

Ships 
Stella (yacht), a class of yacht designed in the UK by C.R. (Kim) Holman in 1959
 SS Stella, various steamships

Other uses
Stella (crater), on the Moon
Stella (satellite), a French geodetic satellite
Stella (United States coin), a pattern gold coin minted from 187980 with a face value of four dollars ($4)
Stella Award, comedy prize now known as Melbourne International Comedy Festival Award
Stella Award, given to people who file ridiculous lawsuits for huge financial gain, based on website by Randy Cassingham
Stella Club d'Adjamé, an association football club based in Abidjan, Ivory Coast
Stella d’Italia, a five-pointed star symbolizing Italy
Stella Polaris, the brightest star in the Ursa Minor constellation

See also
March 2017 North American blizzard, also known as Winter Storm Stella
Stela (disambiguation)
Sella (surname)
Stell (surname)
Stella Maris (disambiguation)
Stellar (disambiguation)
Stellate cell, any neuron that has a star-like shape